Daniel Goyer is a Canadian politician. He was a member of the National Assembly of Quebec for the riding of Deux-Montagnes, first elected in the 2012 election. He was defeated in the 2014 election.

References

Living people
Parti Québécois MNAs
21st-century Canadian politicians
Year of birth missing (living people)